Rickey Darnell Brown (born August 29, 1958)  is an American former professional basketball player. At a height of 2.08 m (6'10") tall, he played at the power forward and center positions.

High school
Brown attended and played high school basketball at West Fulton High School, in Atlanta, Georgia.

College career
Brown played NCAA Division I college basketball at Mississippi State University, with the Mississippi State Bulldogs, from 1976 to 1980.

Professional career
Brown was selected by the Golden State Warriors, in the first round (13th pick overall) of the 1980 NBA draft. He played with the Warriors, from 1980 to 1982. He then played with the Atlanta Hawks, from 1982 to 1985. He played in a total of 340 NBA games.

In 1985, he moved to Italy, to play with Basket Brescia. In the 1987–88 season, he won the EuroLeague championship, while playing with Tracer Milano. He next played with Caja de Ronda and Reyer Venezia Mestre. He played with Real Madrid, from 1991 to 1993, and with them, he won the Saporta Cup championship in 1992, the Spanish League championship in 1993, and the Spanish King's Cup in 1993. In the 1995–96 season, he played briefly with Baskonia.

Personal life
His son, Taylor Brown, is also a professional basketball player.

References

External links
nba.com historical playerfile

Stats fibaeurope.com
thedraftreview.com
acb.com  

1958 births
Living people
American expatriate basketball people in Italy
American expatriate basketball people in the Philippines
American expatriate basketball people in Spain
American men's basketball players
Atlanta Hawks players
Baloncesto Málaga players
Barangay Ginebra San Miguel players
Basket Brescia Leonessa players
Basketball players from Jackson, Mississippi
BC Andorra players
American expatriate basketball people in Andorra
Centers (basketball)
Golden State Warriors draft picks
Golden State Warriors players
Libertas Liburnia Basket Livorno players
Liga ACB players
Mississippi State Bulldogs men's basketball players
Olimpia Milano players
Parade High School All-Americans (boys' basketball)
Philippine Basketball Association imports
Power forwards (basketball)
Real Madrid Baloncesto players
Reyer Venezia players
Saski Baskonia players